Lucius Cornelius Balbus ( 1st century BC) was born in Gades early in the first century BC. Lucius Cornelius Balbus was a wealthy Roman politician and businessman of Punic origin and a native of Gades in Hispania, who played a significant role in the emergence of the Principate at Rome. He was a prominent supporter of Julius Caesar and a close advisor to the emperor Augustus.

Biography 
He served in Hispania under Pompey and Metellus Pius against Sertorius. For his services against Sertorius, Roman citizenship was conferred upon him and his family by Pompey. He accompanied Pompey on his return to Rome in 71 BC, and was for a long time one of his most intimate friends. He also gained the friendship of Julius Caesar, who placed great confidence in him. Balbus' personal friendships with Pompey and Caesar were instrumental in the formation of the First Triumvirate.  He was a chief financier in Rome. Balbus served under Caesar as chief engineer (praefectus fabrum) when Caesar was propraetor to Hispania in 61 BC, and proconsul to Gaul in 58 BC.

His position as a naturalized foreigner, his influence, and his wealth naturally made Balbus many enemies, who in 56 BC put up a native of Gades to prosecute him for illegally assuming the rights of a Roman citizen, a charge directed against the triumvirs equally with himself. Cicero (whose speech has been preserved), Pompey and Crassus all spoke on his behalf, and he was acquitted. During the civil war, Balbus did not take any open part against Pompey, though it was reported that Balbus dined with Caesar, Sallust, Hirtius, Oppius, and Sulpicus Rufus on the night after his famous crossing over the Rubicon river into Italy, which took place on January 10, 49 BC. He endeavored to get Cicero to mediate between Caesar and Pompey, with the object of preventing him from definitely siding with the latter, and Cicero admits that he was dissuaded from doing so, against his better judgement.

Balbus attached himself to Caesar, and, in conjunction with Oppius, managed the entirety of Caesar's affairs in Rome. Subsequently, Balbus became Caesar's private secretary, and Cicero was obliged to ask for his good offices with Caesar. After Caesar's murder in 44 BC, Balbus was equally successful in gaining the favour of Octavian; in 43 BC or 42 BC he was praetor, and in 40 BC he became the first naturalized Roman citizen to attain the consulship. The year of his death is not known. Balbus kept a diary of the chief events in his own and Caesar's life (Ephemeris), which has been lost (Suetonius, Caesar, 81). He took care that Caesar's Commentaries on the Gallic War should be continued; and accordingly the 8th book of the Commentarii de Bello Gallico (which was probably written by his friend Hirtius at his instigation) is dedicated to him.

Notes

References 
 Cicero, Letters (ed. Tyrrell and Purser, iv. introd. p. 62) and Pro Balbo.
 Heatley, Henry Richard and Herbert Napier Kingdon. (1882).  Gradatim, an Easy Latin Translation Book, Oxford: Oxford University Press.  OCLC 77762862
 E. Jullien, De L. Cornelio Balbo Maiore, 1886.
 Pauly-Wissowa, Realencyclopädie, iv. pt. i. 1900.
 Schork, R. J. (1997)   Latin and Roman culture in Joyce. Gainesville: University of FLorida Press. ;   OCLC 243862657
 Smith, William. (1850).   A New Classical Dictionary of Greek and Roman Biography, Mythology and Geography. New York: Harper & Brothers. OCLC 5078784
Rogerson, In Search of Ancient North Africa: A History in Six Lives 

1st-century BC Roman consuls
1st-century BC Punic people
Balbus, Lucius
People from Cádiz
Roman Republican praetors
Romans from Hispania